The New Adventures of Batman is an animated series that aired on CBS from February 12 to May 28, 1977, featuring the DC Comics superheroes Batman and Robin, and Batgirl. The series was a Filmation and DC Comics production in association with Warner Bros. Television (whose current parent company is Warner Bros. Discovery).

Plot
In The New Adventures of Batman, the "Dynamic Duo" fights crime in Gotham City, encountering the classic Batman rogues gallery as well as some original villains. Complicating matters is Bat-Mite, a well-meaning imp from another dimension called Ergo, who considers himself Batman's biggest fan. As a result, he wears a variant of Batman’s costume and attempts to help him, only to often create more problems. Missing is Alfred, the faithful butler of Batman's alter ego Bruce Wayne; also notable in this series are the inverted colors of the circled "R" on Robin's costume.

Voice cast
 Adam West as Batman / Bruce Wayne
 Burt Ward as Robin / Dick Grayson
 Melendy Britt as Batgirl / Barbara Gordon, Catwoman
 Lou Scheimer as Bat-Mite, Batcomputer, Clayface / Matt Hagen (1st and 2nd Times), Lucky's Henchman (in "The Chameleon")
 Lennie Weinrib as Commissioner Gordon, Joker, Penguin / Oswald Cobblepot, Mr. Freeze (in "The Deep Freeze"), Electro (in "Bite-Sized"), Chameleon (in "The Chameleon"), Dr. Devious (in "The Chameleon"), Zarbor, Clayface (3rd Time), Moonman / Scott Rogers (in "The Moonman"), Professor Bubbles (in "The Bermuda Rectangle"), Flow (in "The Bermuda Rectangle"), Lucky Luger (in "The Chameleon"), Professor Frost (in "The Deep Freeze"), Boyd Baxter (in "Curses! Oiled Again!")

Production

Development
In September 1968, before The New Adventures of Batman, Filmation Associates had created and aired an animated Batman series (pre-Bat-Mite), named The Batman/Superman Hour, for CBS. This series, the first Saturday Morning vehicle for the Caped Crusader, paired up new Batman and Robin adventures with old Superman/Superboy episodes. In 1969, it was repackaged into 30-minute episodes without the Man of Steel and renamed Batman with Robin the Boy Wonder.

The New Adventures of Batman was produced concurrently with Super Friends, which was produced by the competing Hanna-Barbera Productions and included Batman and Robin as members, marking a rare occurrence in animation history which saw two studios simultaneously producing series featuring the same characters. The main distinction was that in Filmation’s series, Batman and Robin were voiced by Adam West and Burt Ward, the lead actors of the 1960s Batman series. At the time, Hanna-Barbera's Batman and Robin were voiced by Olan Soule and Casey Kasem, who also voiced the Dynamic Duo for Filmation's 1968 version, The Batman/Superman Hour.

Airdates
The New Adventures of Batman premiered February 12, 1977, on CBS. The episodes from this series were later aired along with other Filmation shows—such as Tarzan, Lord of the Jungle (1976, CBS) —as part of: The Batman/Tarzan Adventure Hour (1977–1978 CBS), Tarzan and the Super 7 (1978–1980 CBS), and Batman and the Super 7 (1980–1981 NBC).

Villains
Just like on the prior Filmation produced Batman series, no backstory or alter ego were presented for Catwoman within the four episodes that she appeared in. The yellow and orange costume design used was unique to the series.

Penguin frequently rolls his 'r's and laughs in a manner similar to Burgess Meredith's portrayal, although he has a high-pitched posh accent. He appears in "Reading, Writing and Wronging", "Birds of a Feather Fool Around Together", and "Have an Evil Day, Parts 1 and 2".

Mr. Freeze appears the episode "The Deep Freeze". Unlike his appearance in the show's opening credits, Mr. Freeze is shown without the helmet that goes with his freeze suit. He and his henchman Professor Frost plot to steal the N-1000 (a superfast submarine) to pull off the "Crime of the Century". When Batman and Robin raid his hideout, Mr. Freeze manages to freeze both of them and takes Robin with him as he escapes. When Freeze and Professor Frost steal the N-1000, they steer it to the North Pole. When Batman, Robin and Bat-Mite face Mr. Freeze and Professor Frost at the North Pole, Batman and Robin fire a beam that reverses the polarity of Freeze's freeze gun so that it warms up. They then apprehend Freeze and Professor Frost where they are both placed into prison.

The Matt Hagen incarnation of Clayface must apply his special potion daily to maintain his powers as Clayface and often took on the forms of animals. In the episode "Dead Ringers", Hagen forces former criminal-turned-acrobat Kit Martin to help him kidnap Arabian Oil Minister Basil Oram and hold him for a #10 million ransom in exchange for not telling Martin's boss of his criminal record. When Batman attempts to intervene, Clayface stages a car accident to knock the Dark Knight out and stow away in the Batmobile to infiltrate the Batcave, where he learns Batman developed amnesia and uses this to discover Batman's secret identity. However, Bat-Mite distracts Clayface long enough for the Bat-Computer to create an antidote for Batman's amnesia. Clayface escapes by water, but Batman pursues him in his Bat-Boat until the former's potion wears off and he nearly drowns due to his inability to swim. Batman saves Hagen and hands him over to the police. In the episode "Curses! Oiled Again", Clayface collaborates with Catwoman to steal a shipment of oil bound for Gotham City during a cold snap and steal the country's oil supply. However, Batman, Robin, Batgirl, and Bat-Mite intervene and defeat the villains. In the two-part episode "Have an Evil Day", Zarbor enlists Clayface, Catwoman, the Joker, and the Penguin to keep the Dynamic Duo busy while he steals America's nuclear power plants.

Missing villains
The Riddler and the Scarecrow were off-limits to the show, as Hanna-Barbera already had the rights to the characters for Challenge of the Super Friends (though the Riddler does appear in the opening credits of the show in a pink-colored costume, and was mentioned being arrested at the beginning of the episode "The Deep Freeze"). This is also the reason why the Joker could not appear in Challenge of the Super Friends, though he was planned as a Legion of Doom member.

Episodes

Home media
The New Adventures of Batman was released on DVD on June 26, 2007, by Warner Home Video (via DC Entertainment and Warner Bros. Family Entertainment); all 16 episodes are collected, and are presented in its original, uncut broadcast presentation and original airdate order. A retrospective detailing the creation of the series titled "Dark Vs. Light: Filmation and The Batman"  featuring Filmation historian Michael Swanigan and Filmation founder Lou Scheimer is included as well.

One episode (the first one, titled "The Pest") was released, along with an episode of Tarzan, Lord of the Jungle, in the Saturday Morning Cartoons: The 1970s Vol. 1 DVD, also released by Warner Home Video.

Legacy
Homage was paid to The New Adventures of Batman in a 1998 episode of Bruce Timm's The New Batman Adventures. In the DVD release audio commentary for the 1998-1999 season, Timm and the rest of the series creators (writer Paul Dini, director Dan Riba, artist Glen Murakami, and storyboarder James Tucker) explain that the first segment of the October 10, 1998, episode "Legends of the Dark Knight" purposely makes use of the same designs The New Adventures of Batman used for the Joker, Batman and Robin, as well as the same color schemes and shading in a nod to both The New Adventures of Batman and to Batman artist Dick Sprang, whose style heavily influenced the visuals of the Filmation cartoon (along with Neal Adams). They further explain that the episode segment also purposely makes use of the trademark silliness and corny tone of the original series (which differs from the darker, serious tone of Timm's series) and also mimics the low frame rate animation style used by Filmation.

References

External links
 The New Adventures of Batman at Big Cartoon DataBase
 
 Filmation animated series
 AOL Television: In2TV: The New Adventures of Batman
 Japanese opening to New Adventures of Batman
 TVshowsondvd.com: DVD Release
 Batman: Yesterday, Today and Beyond - The Batman Homepage - The New Adventures of Batman

1977 American television series debuts
1977 American television series endings
1970s American animated television series
American children's animated action television series
American children's animated adventure television series
American children's animated superhero television series
Batman (TV series)
CBS original programming
English-language television shows
Batman television series by Filmation
NBC original programming
American sequel television series
Animated television shows based on DC Comics
Television series by Warner Bros. Television Studios